Muniyandi Vilangyial Moondramandu is a 2008 Indian Tamil-language romantic drama film written and directed by Thirumurugan. Bharath, Poorna, Ponvannan, and Vadivelu star. The film was produced by Malaysian-based firm Lotus Five Star in association with Thiru Pictures. The music was composed by Vidyasagar with cinematography by Vaidy S art direction by Boopathy Art and editing by Jeyakumar. The film was released on 4 July 2008 to average reviews.

Plot
Muniyandi is a third-year undergraduate zoology student and the son of Muthumani, who happens to be the student canteen contractor of the same college. He meets Madhumitha, the demure young daughter of a local bigwig named Ramaiyya, who gives first priority only to the members of his caste. Madhu makes a coquettish play for all of Muni's friends including Sorimuthu Ayyanar, a part-time witch doctor who is also the peon of the college, dressed complete with bells and saffron cloth regalia, but hits it off with him first. Following a heated skirmish in the caste-dominated college elections, the two of them fall in love. Unfortunately, everything goes topsy-turvy when, once Madhu's marriage is arranged, she turns around and says that she was never in love with Muni in the first place. Furious, Muni thrashes her with his slippers and sets fire to her father's coconut grove. Though she never reveals to this incident to anyone, Muni, on the other hand, discovers the secret behind his brother's death. Muni's brother was killed when he tries to help his friend who is in love with a girl of the other caste. Muni participates in college elections to go against Madhu's words. On the day of the nomination, Muni realizes that Madhu loves him truly, but she had reverted from her feelings due to the request from his father to save his life. Muni convinces college students from conducting the election in college and puts a stop caste game in college. Ramaiyya and the other caste head were supposed to be killed by Raju (Muni's brother's friend and the old girl's lover), which Muni thwarts. Finally, Muni, with his father's acceptance, returns to Madhu (who was waiting for him near the temple) and unites with her.

Cast

 Bharath as Muniyandi Muthumani
 Poorna as Madhumitha Ramaiyya
 Ponvannan as Muthumani
 Vadivelu as Sorimuthu Ayyanar
 L. Raja as Ramaiyya
 Yugendran as Raju
 Thara
 King Kong
 Bonda Mani
 Yuvashree
 Suja Varunee (Special appearance)
 Rangammal as paatti

Soundtrack

Soundtrack was composed by Vidyasagar and lyrics were written by Vairamuthu.

Critical reception
Behindwoods wrote "Muniyandi Vilangiyal Moondram Aandu on the whole is a positive experience, and quite different from Em Magan. The focus shifts from family to love and rivalries. Thirumurugan, who was a favorite with the women in the audience for serials and movies laced with sentiment, has gone in for a bit of a change. This does not mean that this movie is not for the family. It just means that the director has kept a tab on the proceedings and prevented any element from going over the top."

References

External links
 
 Film Review

2008 films
2000s Tamil-language films
Films scored by Vidyasagar
Films set in universities and colleges